Brachypodium pinnatum, the heath false brome or tor-grass, is a species of grass with a widespread distribution in temperate regions of the Northern Hemisphere. The flowerhead is open, with 10 to 15 erect spikelets.

Distribution
The plant can be found in such US states as California, Massachusetts, and Oregon.

Ecology
 
The caterpillars of some Lepidoptera use it as a food plant, e.g. the Essex skipper (Thymelicus lineola). It is also one of the most important host grasses for Auchenorrhyncha in central Europe.

See also
Brachypodium distachyon

References

External links

Tor Grass page from the Flora of Northern Ireland site.
Brachypodium.org
The International Brachypodium Initiative

pinnatum
Grasses of Africa
Grasses of Asia
Grasses of Europe
Taxa named by Palisot de Beauvois

ca:Brachypodium#Brachypodium pinnatum